The Poseidon Adventure is a 1972 American disaster film directed by Ronald Neame, produced by Irwin Allen, and based on Paul Gallico's 1969 novel of the same name. It has an ensemble cast including five Oscar winners: Gene Hackman, Ernest Borgnine, Jack Albertson, Shelley Winters, and Red Buttons. The plot centers on the fictional SS Poseidon, an aging luxury liner on her final voyage from New York City to Athens, before it is scrapped. On New Year's Day, it is overturned by a tsunami. Passengers and crew are trapped inside, and a preacher attempts to lead a small group of survivors to safety.

The film is in the vein of other all-star disaster films of the early through mid-1970s, such as Airport (1970), Earthquake (1974), and The Towering Inferno (1974). It was released in December 1972 and was the highest-grossing film of 1973, earning over $125 million worldwide. It was nominated for eight Academy Awards, and went on to win two Oscars, a Golden Globe Award, a British Academy Film Award, and a Motion Picture Sound Editors Award. A sequel, Beyond the Poseidon Adventure, also based on a novel by Gallico, was released in 1979.

Plot 

The SS Poseidon, an ocean liner slated for retirement, travels from New York City to Athens. Despite safety concerns from Captain Harrison, the new owner's representative insists he go full speed to save money, preventing Poseidon from taking on ballast.

Reverend Frank Scott, a minister who believes "God helps those who help themselves", is traveling to a new parish in Africa as punishment for unorthodox views. Detective Lieutenant Mike Rogo and wife Linda, a former prostitute, deal with her seasickness. Susan Shelby and her younger brother Robin are traveling to meet their parents. Robin is interested in how the ship works and frequently visits the engine room. Retired Jewish store owner Manny Rosen and wife Belle are going to Israel to meet their 2-year-old grandson for the first time. Haberdasher James Martin is a love-shy, health-conscious bachelor. The ship's singer, Nonnie Parry, rehearses for the New Year's Day celebration.

Passengers gather in the dining room to celebrate. The captain is called to the bridge in response to a report of an undersea earthquake. He receives word from the lookout that a tsunami is approaching from the direction of Crete. After issuing a distress signal, the ship is hit broadside and capsizes, floating upside-down.

In the dining room, survivors take stock of their predicament. Acres, an injured waiter, is trapped at the galley door now high above. Scott surmises that the escape route will be found "upwards", at the outer hull, now above water. Scott attempts to convince the dozens of survivors in the dining room to travel with him to the ship's hull. However, the ship's purser tells the crowd to wait for help. Most of the survivors side with the purser. The Rosens, the Rogos, Susan, Robin, Acres, Nonnie, and Martin agree to go with Scott, using a Christmas tree as a ladder. After the group climbs to the galley, there is a series of explosions. As seawater floods the dining room, those remaining attempt to climb the tree, but their weight causes it to fall. Water fills the room, and the ship begins sinking.

Scott leads his group toward the engine room. While they are climbing a ladder inside a ventilation shaft, the ship rocks from more explosions. Acres falls and perishes. Leaving the shaft, the group meets a large band of survivors led by the ship's doctor, heading toward the bow. Scott believes they are heading for their doom, but Rogo wants to follow them and gives Scott 15 minutes to find the engine room. Although he takes longer than allowed, Scott succeeds.

The engine room is on the other side of a flooded corridor. Belle reveals she is a former competitive swimmer and volunteers to go through, but Scott refuses her and dives in. Halfway through, a panel collapses on him. The survivors notice the delay, and Belle dives in. She frees Scott, and they make it to the other side, but Belle suffers a heart attack. Before dying, she tells Scott to give her Chai pendant to Manny, to give to their grandson. Rogo swims over to make sure Belle and Scott are all right, then leads the rest over. When Manny finds Belle's body, he is unwilling to go on, but Scott gives him her pendant, reminding him that he has a reason to live.

Scott leads the survivors to the propeller shaft room's watertight door, but additional explosions cause Linda to lose her grip and fall to her death. A heartbroken Rogo blames Scott. A ruptured pipe releases steam, blocking their escape. Scott rants at God for the survivors' deaths as he leaps across a pool of flaming oil, grabbing onto the burning-hot valve wheel to shut down the steam. Scott tells Rogo to lead the group on before falling to his death.

Rogo leads the remaining survivors — Manny, Martin, Nonnie, Susan, and Robin — through the watertight doors and into the propeller shaft tunnel. They hear a noise from outside and bang on the hull to attract attention. The rescuers cut through the hull, assist the six survivors from the ship, inform them that no one else survived, and fly them to safety.

Cast 

 Gene Hackman as Reverend Frank Scott
 Ernest Borgnine as Detective Lieutenant Mike Rogo
 Red Buttons as James Martin
 Carol Lynley as Nonnie Parry
 Roddy McDowall as Acres
 Stella Stevens as Linda Rogo
 Shelley Winters as Belle Rosen
 Jack Albertson as Manny Rosen
 Pamela Sue Martin as Susan Shelby
 Arthur O'Connell as Chaplain John
 Eric Shea as Robin Shelby
 Leslie Nielsen as Captain Harrison
 Fred Sadoff as Linarcos
 Byron Webster as Purser
 Jan Arvan as Dr. Caravello
 Sheila Mathews as Nurse
 John Crawford as Chief Engineer
 Bob Hastings as M.C.
 Erik Nelson as Tinkham

Casting
Sally Kellerman was considered for the role of Linda Rogo. Petula Clark was offered the role of Nonnie Parry, but turned it down. Gene Wilder was originally cast as James Martin, but then later dropped out. Burt Lancaster was offered the role of Reverend Frank Scott, but turned it down as he didn't feel the role was right for him.

Production 
The novel was acquired by Avco Embassy Pictures in 1969 and Allen's Kent Productions signed a deal with them to make three movies, including The Poseidon Adventure. Avco Embassy cancelled the production, and it moved to 20th Century-Fox who contributed half of the budget. Steve Broidy and Sherrill Corwin helped finance the rest.

Parts of the movie were filmed aboard  in Long Beach, California. Paul Gallico had been inspired to write the novel after a vacation aboard the ship in 1937 in which it was rocked by high waves.

Music 
The score for the film was composed and conducted by John Williams. The song "The Morning After", written by Al Kasha and Joel Hirschhorn, won the 1972 Academy Award for Best Original Song at the 45th Academy Awards in March 1973. It was performed in the film by Renée Armand, dubbing for Carol Lynley. A version of "The Morning After" performed by Maureen McGovern became a hit single in 1973.

There was no soundtrack album at the time of the film's release. The score was first released as a CD by Film Score Monthly in July 1998. A remastered version was released by La-La Land Records on April 20, 2010. La-La Land Records released a second, newly remastered edition of Williams' score on December 3, 2019, as part of a boxset also including Williams' scores for Earthquake and The Towering Inferno.

Release
The Poseidon Adventure opened Tuesday, December 12, 1972, as the first film at the newly opened National Theatre in Times Square in New York City.

Home media
It has been released on VHS, Laserdisc, DVD and Blu-ray.

Reception

Critical reception

Review aggregator Rotten Tomatoes reports that 82% of 28 critics gave the film a positive review, and the average score is 7/10. The critical consensus reads: "The Poseidon Adventure exemplifies the disaster film done right, going down smoothly with ratcheting tension and a terrific ensemble to give the peril a distressingly human dimension". Metacritic gave the film a score of 70 based on 10 reviews, indicating "generally favorable reviews".

Roger Ebert gave the film two-and-a-half stars out of four and called it "the kind of movie you know is going to be awful, and yet somehow you gotta see it, right?" A. H. Weiler of The New York Times wrote that "though tensions slacken and credibility is strained here, realistic technical effects make the stricken ship and the efforts of its survivors to escape a fairly spellbinding adventure". Variety called the film "a highly imaginative and lustily-produced meller" with "some of the most exciting sequences seen in years". Gene Siskel gave the film three stars out of four and wrote that "the film's technical excellence—special effects, production design, and the stars doing their own stunts—holds one's interest". Charles Champlin of the Los Angeles Times wrote that "the special effects—the genuinely remarkable production values and technical wizardries—sweep everything else aside. Are the characters as gaudy and thin as cereal boxes? Is the dialog banal and shrill? Is the moralizing heavy-handed and relentless? Is the hokum a bit thick even in the context of a showmanship special? Well, yes. But who cares?" Gary Arnold of The Washington Post wrote that the film was "strictly formula hokum, but reasonably diverting if one doesn't ask for more than the filmmakers care to give—that is, for imaginative writing and direction. As usual, only the special effects and set designers and the stunt men have been permitted to be playful and creative".

Box office
The film expanded to 205 engagements by Christmas Day with a gross to that date of $2,604,168 in the United States which made it the number one film at the US box office. It remained at number one through the New Year period but was displaced by The Getaway for one week before returning to number one for 8 consecutive weeks. It spent another two weeks at number one for a total of 12 weeks atop the box office. The film went on to earn theatrical rentals of $40 million in the United States and Canada in 1973 being the highest-grossing film of the year. The film was reissued in June 1974 and was number one at the US box office in its first week. The film earned rentals of $75 million worldwide, from a worldwide gross of over $125 million.

TV premiere
When the film made its network television premiere on ABC on October 27, 1974, it earned a Nielsen rating of 39.0 and an audience share of 62%, making it the sixth-highest rated film to ever air on network television.

Awards and nominations

Legacy
The Poseidon Adventure has become a cult film. It is in the vein of other all-star disaster films of the 1970s, such as Airport, and later ones like Earthquake (1974) and The Towering Inferno (1974). It is listed in Golden Raspberry Award founder John Wilson's book, The Official Razzie Movie Guide, as one of The 100 Most Enjoyably Bad Movies Ever Made.

Mad'''s September 1973 edition satirized the movie as "The Poopsidedown Adventure". Its cover was the first Mad cover not to show Alfred E. Neuman's face. Instead, he is shown floating upside down with only his feet in sight jutting out from an SS Poseidon life preserver. It became the best-selling issue in the magazine's history.

Sequel and remakes
A 1979 sequel, Beyond the Poseidon Adventure, which was also based on a novel by Gallico, was released later with an equally star-studded cast.The Poseidon Adventure has been remade twice, first as a television special in 2005 with the same name, and as a theatrical release titled Poseidon in 2006.

 See also 
 List of American films of 1972
 The Last Voyage'' (1960)
 Survival film, about the film genre, with a list of related films

References

External links 

 
 
 
 
 

1972 films
1970s disaster films
1970s thriller drama films
1970s American films
20th Century Fox films
American disaster films
American survival films
American thriller drama films
Films scored by John Williams
Films about death
Films about survivors of seafaring accidents or incidents
Films based on American novels
Films based on thriller novels
Films based on works by Paul Gallico
Films directed by Ronald Neame
Films featuring a Best Supporting Actress Golden Globe-winning performance
Films produced by Irwin Allen
Films set on ships
Films that won the Best Original Song Academy Award
Films set around New Year
Films with screenplays by Stirling Silliphant
Films with screenplays by Wendell Mayes
Sea adventure films
Seafaring films
1972 drama films
Films set in the Mediterranean Sea
1970s English-language films